Maya Johnson may refer to:

Maya Angelou, real surname Johnson
Maya Johnson (musician) with The Billy Tipton Memorial Saxophone Quartet